Panasonic Lumix DMC-LC43 is a compact digital camera by Panasonic Lumix. The highest-resolution pictures it records are 4 megapixels.

References

External links

DMC-LC43 on shop.panasonic.com
DMC-LC43 on Flickr

LC43